Kazanka may refer to:
Kazanka (river), a river in the Republic of Tatarstan, Russia
Kazanka, Russia, name of several rural localities in Russia
Kazanka, Ukraine, an urban-type settlement in Mykolaiv Oblast, Ukraine
Kazanka (boat), a type of motorboat

See also
Kazan (disambiguation)